Acropentias is a genus of moths of the family Crambidae.

Species
Acropentias aureus Butler, 1878
Acropentias papuensis Hampson, 1919

References

Crambidae genera
Taxa named by Edward Meyrick